Elections to Coleraine Borough Council were held on 20 May 1981 on the same day as the other Northern Irish local government elections. The election used three district electoral areas to elect a total of 20 councillors.

Election results

Note: "Votes" are the first preference votes.

Districts summary

|- class="unsortable" align="centre"
!rowspan=2 align="left"|Ward
! % 
!Cllrs
! % 
!Cllrs
! %
!Cllrs
! %
!Cllrs
! % 
!Cllrs
!rowspan=2|TotalCllrs
|- class="unsortable" align="center"
!colspan=2 bgcolor="" | UUP
!colspan=2 bgcolor="" | DUP
!colspan=2 bgcolor="" | SDLP
!colspan=2 bgcolor="" | Alliance
!colspan=2 bgcolor="white"| Others
|-
|align="left"|Area A
|bgcolor="40BFF5"|34.2
|bgcolor="40BFF5"|2
|26.1
|2
|28.0
|2
|1.7
|0
|10.0
|0
|6
|-
|align="left"|Area B
|bgcolor="40BFF5"|43.4
|bgcolor="40BFF5"|4
|34.2
|2
|10.0
|0
|11.4
|1
|1.0
|0
|7
|-
|align="left"|Area C
|27.4
|2
|bgcolor="#D46A4C"|38.1
|bgcolor="#D46A4C"|2
|0.0
|0
|6.3
|0
|28.2
|3
|7
|-
|- class="unsortable" class="sortbottom" style="background:#C9C9C9"
|align="left"| Total
|34.2
|8
|33.2
|6
|11.7
|2
|6.3
|1
|14.6
|3
|20
|-
|}

Districts results

Area A

1977: 3 x UUP, 1 x DUP, 1 x SDLP, 1 x Independent Unionist
1981: 2 x UUP, 2 x DUP, 2 x SDLP
1977-1981 Change: DUP and SDLP gain from UUP and Independent Unionist

Area B

1977: 4 x UUP, 1 x Alliance, 1 x SDLP, 1 x Independent Unionist
1981: 4 x UUP, 2 x DUP, 1 x Alliance
1977-1981 Change: DUP (two seats) gain from SDLP and Independent Unionist

Area C

1977: 3 x UUP, 2 x Independent, 1 x DUP, 1 x Alliance
1981: 3 x Independent, 2 x DUP, 2 x UUP
1977-1981 Change: DUP and Independent gain from UUP and Alliance

References

Coleraine Borough Council elections
Coleraine